Adaševci is a village located in the municipality of Šid, Srem District, Vojvodina, Serbia. The village has a Serb ethnic majority and its population numbering 1,919 people (2011 census).

Adaševci is located 5 kilometers south of Šid, in large part on the west side bordering the river Bosut, near the village there is an international highway. In the village there is a memorial "Sremski Front", as well as a source of thermal water. Today, Adaševci is one of the largest villages in the municipality of Šid. In the village there is a cultural centre which can accommodate about 500 guests and is used for various cultural and sporting events. The largest number of young people gathers F.K. "Adaševci", founded in 1924, which compete in the municipal league. Adaševci have a primary school built in 1952, which today has 400 pupils. Mostly the agricultural town have its own water supply with 12 kilometers of water supply network, with regular supply of quality drinking water. Adaševci with its geographical location have great potential for tourism development and improving quality of life.

Name
The name of the village in Serbian is plural.

History
The 8th century BC ornitho-morphic fibulae was found in the town.

Demographics
Historical population
 1961: 2,562
 1971: 2,566
 1981: 2,363
 1991: 2,080
 2002: 2,166
 2011: 1,919

See also
 List of places in Serbia
 List of cities, towns and villages in Vojvodina

References

 Slobodan Ćurčić, Broj stanovnika Vojvodine, Novi Sad, 1996.

Populated places in Syrmia